The 2018–19 FIU Panthers women's basketball team represents Florida International University during the 2018–19 NCAA Division I women's basketball season. The Panthers, led by third year head coach Tiara Malcom, play their home games at FIU Arena, and were members of Conference USA. They finished the season 5–24, 2–14 in Conference USA play to finish in a 3 way tie for twelfth place. Due to a tie breaker loss to Florida Atlantic and UTSA they failed to qualify for the Conference USA women's tournament.

Roster

Schedule

|-
!colspan=9 style=| Non-conference regular season

|-
!colspan=9 style=| Conference USA regular season

See also
2018–19 FIU Panthers men's basketball team

References

FIU Panthers women's basketball seasons
FIU
FIU Panthers women's basketball
FIU Panthers women's basketball